Summit Mountain is located in the Lewis Range, Glacier National Park in the U.S. state of Montana. Summit Mountain towers to the north of Marias Pass and is situated along the Continental Divide.

See also
 Mountains and mountain ranges of Glacier National Park (U.S.)

References

Mountains of Flathead County, Montana
Mountains of Glacier County, Montana
Summit
Lewis Range
Mountains of Montana